Crab Wood is a  biological Site of Special Scientific Interest west of Winchester in Hampshire.

This site has been wooded at least since the sixteenth century. It has a hazel layer which has been coppiced, large oaks and some beech, ash and birch trees. There is a rich butterfly fauna, including purple emperors.

References

 

Local Nature Reserves in Hampshire 
Sites of Special Scientific Interest in Hampshire